The Plaza Semanggi is a commercial complex at Semanggi Interchange in South Jakarta, Indonesia. The commercial center includes a shopping mall, an auditorium Balai Sarbini and office tower Gedung Veteran RI. The auditorium and office tower were constructed in 1973. The name The Plaza Semanggi more correctly refers to the shopping mall which was opened in 2004 with the refurbishment of Balai Sarbini and Gedung Veteran RI.

History

Dome-roofed Balai Sarbini auditorium and the adjoining Gedung Veteran, also called the Graha Purna Yudha tower, were the buildings that were located on the northeast corner of Semanggi cloverleaf bridge. Both buildings were built by President Sukarno in 1965 for the Indonesian Veterans Legion to look after the interests of veterans who had fought against foreign aggression to maintain Indonesia's independence. Funding shortages meant they were not completed until 1973 and then opened by President Suharto.

In the early 2000s, the Plaza Semanggi was built around the refurbished Balai Sarbini and Gedung Veteran. It was officially opened by Sukarno's daughter, President Megawati Sukarnoputri, in 2004.

References

Cited works

Shopping malls in Jakarta
South Jakarta